Albert Knapp (25 July 1798, Tübingen - 18 June 1864, Stuttgart) was a German poet and animal welfare activist.

Biography
He studied theology at Tübingen, became vicar in Feuerbach (1820) and filled other positions until he made a reputation in the Hospitalkirche at Stuttgart (1836). After becoming pastor at Stuttgart, he had applied himself to poetry, especially to the composition of hymns and other poetry of a religious character. Rev. Knapp is also distinguished as an important figure in the history of the animal welfare movement in Germany. In 1837, he established the Stuttgart Society, the first German animal protection organisation in Stuttgart.

Writings
He published his hymns annually in a small volume between 1833 and 1853, under the title of Christoterpe. Among his other publications in verse are three collections of poems (Stuttgart: Christliche gedichten, 1829; Neuern gedichte, 1834; and Gedichte, neueste Folge, 1843); Evangelischer Liederschatz für Kirche und Haus (“Evangelical treasury of songs for church and home,” 1837; 3d ed., 1865), a collection taken from the liturgies and hymns of every Christian century, to which Christenlieder (1841) is a supplement; and the cycles Hohenstauffen (1839) and Bilder der Vorwelt (1862).

He also wrote prose: Das Leben von Ludwig Hofacker. See also Gesammelten prosaischen Schriften (“Collected prose,” 1870-75; published posthumously).

Notes

References

Further reading
Gerok, K., Albert Knapp als schwäbischer Dichter (Stuttgart 1881)
Knapp, A., Knapp als Dichter und Schriftsteller (Tübingen 1913)
 Ulrich Trohler and Andreas-Holger Maehle, "Anti-vivisection in Nineteenth-century Germany and Switzerland: Motives and Methods" in Vivisection in Historical Perspective, ed. Nicolaas A. Rupke (London: Routledge, 1987), 149-187.
 Werner Raupp (Ed.): Gelebter Glaube. Erfahrungen und Lebenszeugnisse aus unserem Land. Ein Lesebuch, Metzingen/Württ.: Ernst Franz-Verlag 1993, p. 236–241, 391 (Introduction, Source material, Lit.). 

1798 births
1864 deaths
19th-century German male writers
19th-century German poets
German animal welfare workers
Anti-vivisectionists
German male poets
People from the Kingdom of Württemberg